Cobălcescu is a Romanian-language surname that may refer to:

Grigore Cobălcescu (1831–1892), geologist and paleontologist
Cobalescou Island
Cobălcescu gas field
East Cobălcescu gas field
South Cobălcescu gas field

Romanian-language surnames